Étienne Rognon (17 September 1869, Lyon - 18 March 1948) was a French politician. He joined at first the French Workers' Party (POF), which in 1902 merged into the Socialist Party of France (PSdF), which in turn merged into the French Section of the Workers' International (SFIO) in 1905. He was a member of the Chamber of Deputies from 1909 to 1932. A street in the 7th arrondissement of Lyon is named after him.

References

1869 births
1948 deaths
Politicians from Lyon
French Workers' Party politicians
Socialist Party of France (1902) politicians
French Section of the Workers' International politicians
Members of the 9th Chamber of Deputies of the French Third Republic
Members of the 10th Chamber of Deputies of the French Third Republic
Members of the 11th Chamber of Deputies of the French Third Republic
Members of the 12th Chamber of Deputies of the French Third Republic
Members of the 13th Chamber of Deputies of the French Third Republic
Members of the 14th Chamber of Deputies of the French Third Republic
Knights of the Order of the White Lion